James Jackson (3 October 1777 in Newburyport, Massachusetts – 27 August 1867 in Boston) was an American physician. He was a proponent of Massachusetts General Hospital and became its first physician.

Life and career
He was the son of Newburyport merchant Jonathan Jackson who had been a representative of Massachusetts in the Continental Congress. He graduated from Harvard in 1796, and, after teaching for a year in Leicester Academy, was employed until December 1797 as a clerk for his father, who was then an officer of the government. After studying medicine in Salem for two years, he sailed for London, where he became a “dresser” in St. Thomas's Hospital, and attended lectures there and at Guy's Hospital.

He returned to Boston in 1800, and began a medical practice, which he continued until 1866. In 1803 he became a member of the Massachusetts Medical Society, and in 1810 he proposed with John Collins Warren the establishment of a hospital and an asylum for the insane. Somerville Asylum was soon founded, and afterward the Massachusetts General Hospital was begun in Boston, of which he was the first physician until he resigned in 1835. In 1810 he was chosen professor of clinical medicine at Harvard Medical School, and in 1812 professor of theory and practice, which post he held until 1835, and was afterward professor emeritus until his death. Jackson was elected a Fellow of the American Academy of Arts and Sciences in 1808.

Family
He was the brother of Lowell, Massachusetts, industrialist Patrick Tracy Jackson, and Massachusetts Supreme Court judge Charles Jackson.  Among his students was Oliver Wendell Holmes, Sr., who married his brother Charles' daughter Amelia Lee Jackson.

Works
 On the Brunomian System (1809)
 "Remarks on the Medical Effects of Dentition" in the New England Medical and Surgical Journal (1812)
 Eulogy on Dr. John Warren (1815)
 Syllabus of Lectures (1816)
 Text-Book of Lectures (1825–27)
 A memoir of his son, James Jackson, Jr., who died in 1834
 Letters to a Young Physician (1855; 4th ed., 1856)
He also published articles in the Transactions of the Massachusetts Medical Society, of which he was elected president several times.  Reports drawn up principally or entirely by him include:
 “On Cow Pox and Small Pox”
 “On Spotted Fever”
 “On Spasmodic Cholera”
He also made numerous other contributions to the New England Medical and Surgical Journal and other periodicals.

References

External links
 

1777 births
1867 deaths
19th-century American physicians
Fellows of the American Academy of Arts and Sciences
People from Newburyport, Massachusetts
Harvard College alumni
Harvard Medical School faculty
McLean Hospital physicians